The men's football tournament at the 2017 Southeast Asian Games was held from 14 to 29 August in Malaysia in August 2017. In this tournament, all 11 Southeast Asian teams played in the men's competition. In addition to the host city of Kuala Lumpur, matches were also played in Shah Alam and Selayang. Associations affiliated with FIFA might send teams to participate in the tournament. Men's teams were restricted to under-22 players (born on or after 1 January 1995).

Thailand won the tournament for the sixteenth time, since their victory in the 2015 Southeast Asian Games.

Competition schedule
The following was the competition schedule for the men's football competitions:

Participating nations
The following eleven teams participated for the competition.

  (BRU)
  (CAM)
  (INA)
  (LAO)
  (MAS)
  (MYA)
  (PHI)
  (SGP)
  (THA)
  (TLS)
  (VIE)

Venues

The tournament was held in four venues across three cities:
 Shah Alam Stadium, Shah Alam
 UiTM Stadium, Shah Alam
 UM Arena Stadium, Kuala Lumpur
 Selayang Municipal Council Stadium, Selayang

The Kuala Lumpur Football Stadium was one of the original venue for the football tournament, until it was replaced by Selayang Municipal Council Stadium in July 2017 due to unsatisfactory conditions in the stadium renovations. The Bukit Jalil National Stadium were also originally planned for the final matches before it was changed to Shah Alam Stadium due to several factors.

Squads

The men's tournament was an under-22 international tournament (born on or after 1 January 1995), with a maximum of three overage players allowed, while there were no age restrictions on women's teams.

Draw
The draw for the tournament was held on 8 July 2017, 10:00 MST (UTC+8), at the Renaissance Kuala Lumpur Hotel, Kuala Lumpur. The 11 teams in the men's tournament were drawn into two groups of five and six teams. The teams were seeded into four pots based on their performances in the previous Southeast Asian Games.

The hosts Malaysia were automatically assigned into position A1, and the defending champions Thailand were automatically assigned into position B1.

Group stage 
All times are Malaysia Standard Time (UTC+8).

Group A

Group B 
All times are Malaysia Standard Time (UTC+8).

Knockout stage

Semi-finals

Bronze medal match

Gold medal match

Winners

Goalscorers
4 goals

 Thanabalan Nadarajah
 Aung Thu
 Nguyễn Công Phượng

3 goals

 Septian David
 Phithack Kongmathilath
 Than Paing

2 goals

 Dhia Azrai Naim Rosman
 Safawi Rasid
 Aung Kaung Mann
 Javier Gayoso
 Chenrop Samphaodi
 Nattawut Sombatyotha
 Picha Autra
 Đoàn Văn Hậu
 Hồ Tuấn Tài

1 goal

 Zulkhairy Razali
 Nen Sothearoth
 Evan Dimas
 Ezra Walian
 Febri Haryadi
 Marinus Wanewar
 Muhammad Hargianto
 Rezaldi Hehanusa
 Saddil Ramdani
 Phathana Phommathep
 Thanin Phanthavong
 Adam Nor Azlin
 Adib Zainuddin
 Muhd Nor Azam Abdul Azih
 Hlaing Bo Bo
 Maung Maung Lwin
 Shwe Ko
 Sithu Aung
 Kouichi Belgira
 Reymart Cubon
 Amiruldin Asraf
 Ikhsan Fandi
 Taufik Suparno
 Chaiyawat Buran
 Montree Promsawat
 Phitiwat Sukjitthammakul
 Sittichok Kannoo
 Worachit Kanitsribampen
 Gumario Augusto da Silva
 Hà Đức Chinh
 Nguyễn Quang Hải
 Nguyễn Văn Toàn
 Vũ Văn Thanh

Own goal

 Khalid Wassadisalleh Mahmud
 Norman Haikal Rendra Iskandar
 Jeremiah Raphael Rocha

Final ranking

See also
Women's tournament

References

External links
Official website

Men's_tournament